Rajkumar Badole (born 28 March 1963) is an Indian politician. He is a Bharatiya Janata Party member and had represented Arjuni Morgaon in 13th Maharashtra Legislative Assembly in Devendra Fadnavis ministry.

Early life
Rajkumar Badole was born on 28 March 1963 in Gondia district of Maharashtra region. He completed his higher secondary education from Zilla Parishad School and then pursued Civil Engineering degree. After successful completion of his degree he joined Maharashtra State Irrigation Department as a Sectional Engineer in Buldhana District. He served the post from 1985 to 2008.

Personal life
Rajkumar Badole's mother's name is Gangabai and father's name is Sudam Badole. He is married to Mrs Sharda Badole. They have a daughter Shruti and two sons Aniket and Swapnil. His family, inspired by B. R. Ambedkar, follows Buddhism and he strongly believes in Buddhist philosophy. In July–August 2018, he became a Buddhist Samanera in Thailand.

Political career
Rajkumar Badole started his public life in 2009 when he was elected as BJP MLA for the first time from Sadak Arjuni constituency with a win of 39000 votes. In 2014, he was elected from Arjuni Morgaon and also served as a Cabinet Minister for the Department of Social Justice and Special Assistance of Maharashtra State and the Guardian Minister for Gondia District until June 2019.

In 2013 he proposed changes to School Education departments' syllabus to include seniors into its Moral Values Education.

Contribution
 Led the Department of Social Justice and Special Assistance to purchase the house in London where B. R. Ambedkar lived from 1921 to 1922 and converted to a memorial. It was inaugurated by Prime Minister Narendra Modi in 2015.
 Set up an 'Ambedkar Chair&' at the London School of Economics (LSE), B. R. Ambedkar's alma mater.
 Hostels established in Mumbai, Pune and Nagpur for working women belonging to the backward classes.
 Dr. Babasaheb Ambedkar Samata Pratishthan created in the State on the basis of Central Government's Dr. Babasaheb Ambedkar Foundation.
 Expanded the International Scholarship Scheme from 50 students to 75.
 Set up Transgender Welfare Board.
 Formulated Divyang Dhoran to aid differently-abled people of the state.

Positions held
President, BJP Gondia District
Member, Maharashtra Legislative Assembly - 2 consecutive terms, from 2009 to 2014 and 2014 to 2019.
Cabinet Minister for Social Justice and Special Assistance Department, Government of Maharashtra. Year 2014 - 2019.
2014-2019, as Guardian Minister of Gondia district.

References

External links

Official website (personal)
Official profile on Bharatiya Janata Party - Maharashtra website

1963 births
Maharashtra MLAs 2009–2014
Maharashtra MLAs 2014–2019
Indian Buddhists
20th-century Buddhists
21st-century Buddhists
Bharatiya Janata Party politicians from Maharashtra
Living people
People from Gondia district